Vaisali is a 1989 Indian Malayalam-language period drama film, directed and edited by Bharathan. Produced by M. M. Ramachandran and scripted by M. T. Vasudevan Nair, it was an adaptation of a sub-story told by Vedavyasa to King Yudhishtira in the epic Mahabharatha. It is the story of Vaisali, a devadasi girl who was assigned the mission of seducing Rishyashrungan, the son of Mahirshi Vibhandakan and bringing him to Chambapuri to perform a mahayagam to bring rain.

Plot
Years ago, a certain Brahmin had visited the kingdom of Angarajyam. The king, Lomapadan (Babu Antony), failed to pay respects to the Brahmin. In retaliation, the Brahmin cursed the king that his kingdom would not experience any rains in the coming years and that the kingdom would suffer a severe drought. Thus, Angarajyam suffered for almost twelve years.

Lomapadan, having had enough, decides to visit his rajguru (Nedumudi Venu) to seek for a solution. The rajguru was now living at the outskirts of the kingdom's capital Champapuri to desuade his own son, Chitrangadan (Ashokan), from unwanted activities. Chitrangadan was a rebel who did not follow his father's footsteps and was bent on breaking the social norms laid down by the society at that time.
However, Chitrangadan's heart was set on Vaishali (Suparna Anand), a girl who hailed from the kingdom's community of dancing girls. Vaishali, on the other hand, did not reciprocate Chitrangadan's feelings.

Meanwhile, the rajguru visits the kingdom on Lomapadan's request and decides to perform rituals to propitiate the rain god Indra, while also knowing that by performing such rituals nothing will bear fruit. However, one night, the rajguru gets a vision from his own guru that to bring rains to the kingdom, the rituals were to be performed by Rishyashringa (Sanjay Mitra), the young son of the great sage Vibhandakan. For this, Rishyashringa had to be brought to the kingdom by any means. When Lomapadan enquired, the rajguru stated that Rishyashringa could be brought to the kingdom by enticing him with the women of the kingdom since the young sage had never seen a woman or a girl throughout his life. For this, the king decides to appoint the young Vaishali to embark on the dangerous mission, by order of the rajguru. Accompanied by her mother, Malini(Geetha), and her companions, Vaishali sets off for the forests where Rishyashringa lived via the Kaushiki river.

When the dancing girls reach the forests, Vaishali introduces herself to the young sage as a hermit herself. By seductive means, she manages to lure Rishyashringa into her fold, despite warnings from his father Vibhandakan. Thus the young couple have many a lovely moments for each other. However, Vibhandakan again senses something fishy and rebukes his son for not following the routine rituals and instead frolicking around like an aimless man even after innumerable times of warning. Rishyashringa realises his mistakes and decides to focus on his yogic path as before while trying to avoid his lady love. Vaishali is pained at seeing him in his present condition, while at this moment she also comes in terms that she is truly in love with Rishyashringa. Her mother also reveals that Vaishali was the illegitimate child of the king Lomapadan and that if they were successful in their mission, the king would whole heartedly accept her as his daughter and also have her married to Rishyashringa. Thus, Vaishali decides to attempt one last time into luring him by seductively dancing in front of him during his penance. Unable to control his feelings, Rishyashringa gives in and accompanies Vaishali to her home.

However, he senses something dreadful and realises that whatever happened to him till that point was a mere illusion and was bent on placing a curse on Vaishali by accusing her of being a demon in disguise. When she pleads him to not curse her, she reveals her true identity and that she was just a mere human woman. She further explains the reason of her mission and her feelings for him. Rishyashringa is convinced and the couple decide to set off for Angarajyam.

Rishyashringa is welcomed to the kingdom with due respect and performs the rituals for the rains. After a while, there is a heavy shower of rains and the whole kingdom rejoices, including the royal family as well. At this point, the king announces his daughter's hand in marriage to the young sage, declaring that the child born out of this marriage would rule Angarajyam after Lomapadan. As Vaishali and her mother try to step into the ritual podium to claim their rights, the rajguru and the soldiers block them to prevent their entry. Instead of keeping his word, Lomapadan offers his daughter Shanta's (Parvathy Jayaram) hand in marriage to Rishyashringa. As the crowds follow the newly weds' chariot, Vaishali and her mother are trampled in the stampede where her mother dies eventually. Vaishali is left alone, heartbroken and devastated at what had happened, for nobody bothered about her anymore. What lies ahead of her remains unknown, as she is left to fend for herself.

Cast
 Suparna Anand as Vaisali
 Sanjay Mitra as Rishyashrungan 
 Parvathy Jayaram as Shanta
 Babu Antony as Lomapadhan
 Geetha as Malini
 Nedumudi Venu as Rajaguru
 V. K. Sreeraman as Vibhandaka
 Valsala Menon 
 Ashokan as Chandrangadan
 Jayalalita as Vershini

Production
Bharathan had been planning to film Vaisali since 1982. But several factors made him wait till 1988.
Bharathan was searching for an actor to play the role of King Lomapadan. The moment he came across Babu Antony, he decided to cast him. As Bharathan was then working on Chilambu, he decided to launch Babu Antony as the main villain in it.
This was the first script by M. T. Vasudevan Nair for Bharathan.
The editing of Vaishali was done by Bharathan himself.
The art direction was done by Krishnamoorthy.
This film was produced by Dr. M. M. Ramachandran, popularly known as Atlas Ramachandran.
 Bharathan, assisted by Sasi Menon, did the poster designs and paper ads for the film.
Sreeja Ravi has given voice for Suparna Anand and Krishnachandran for Sanjay Mitra. Anandavally and Narendra Prasad lent voice for Geetha and Babu Antony respectively.

Reception 
The film was commercial success. The film collected over ₹1 crore from box office. On January 1990, Angela Joseph of Screen wrote, " Vasudevan Nair's narration of the episode brings it startlingly into focus as a topical event complete with the intrigues, manipulations and trickery one associates with statecraft Vasudevan Nair's dialogue is full of present day punches and relevant connotations, the telling social comments, the offers through many of the characters in the film reveal the masterly touches of Malayalam cinema's most highly priced scriptwriter." Further writing, "The technical qualities of the film are equally of a high caliber to bring to the screen this universal theme producer Ramachandran and the director Bharathan assembled what they claim is a 'national' cast."

Soundtrack

Awards
National Film Award – 1988

Kerala State Film Awards – 1988

References

External links
 
 Excerpts from the film's script
 Malayalachalachithram

1988 films
1980s Malayalam-language films
Films scored by Ravi
Films set in ancient India
Films directed by Bharathan
Films with screenplays by M. T. Vasudevan Nair